An ice tongue is a long and narrow sheet of ice projecting out from the coastline. An ice tongue forms when a valley glacier moves very rapidly (relative to surrounding ice) out into the ocean or a lake. They can gain mass from water freezing at their base, or by snow falling on top of them. Mass is then lost by calving or by melting. Icebergs are often formed when ice tongues break off in part or wholly from the main glacier.
Two examples of ice tongues are the Erebus Ice Tongue and the Drygalski Ice Tongue.

References

Bodies of ice
Glaciers